Golfe-Juan-Vallauris is a railway station serving Vallauris, Alpes-Maritimes department, southeastern France. It is situated on the Marseille–Ventimiglia railway, between Cannes and Nice. The station is served by regional trains (TER Provence-Alpes-Côte d'Azur) to Cannes, Grasse, Antibes and Nice.

References

TER Provence-Alpes-Côte-d'Azur
Railway stations in Alpes-Maritimes